{{DISPLAYTITLE:C15H22O3}}
The molecular formula C15H22O3 (molar mass: 255.33 g/mol) may refer to: 

 Gemfibrozil, an oral drug used to lower lipid levels 
 Nardosinone, a sesquiterpene
 Octyl salicylate, an ingredient in sunscreens
 Sterpuric acid, a sesquiterpene
 Xanthoxin, a carotenoid

Molecular formulas